Split tunneling is a computer networking concept which allows a user to access dissimilar security domains like a public network (e.g., the Internet) and a  local area network or wide area network at the same time, using the same or different network connections. This connection state is usually facilitated through the simultaneous use of a LAN network interface controller (NIC), radio NIC, Wireless LAN (WLAN) NIC, and VPN client software application without the benefit of an access control.

For example, suppose a user utilizes a remote access VPN software client connecting to a campus network using a hotel wireless network. The user with split tunneling enabled is able to connect to file servers, database servers, mail servers and other servers on the corporate network through the VPN connection. When the user connects to Internet resources (websites, FTP sites, etc.), the connection request goes directly out the gateway provided by the hotel network. However, not every VPN allows split tunneling. Some VPNs with split tunneling include Private Internet Access (PIA), ExpressVPN, and Surfshark.

Split tunneling is sometimes categorized based on how it is configured. A split tunnel configured to only tunnel traffic destined to a specific set of destinations is called a split-include tunnel. When configured to accept all traffic except traffic destined to a specific set of destinations, it is called a split-exclude tunnel.

Advantages
One advantage of using split tunneling is that it alleviates bottlenecks and conserves bandwidth as Internet traffic does not have to pass through the VPN server.

Another advantage is in the case where a user works at a supplier or partner site and needs access to network resources on both networks. Split tunneling prevents the user from having to continually connect and disconnect.

Disadvantages
A disadvantage is that when split tunneling is enabled, users bypass gateway level security that might be in place within the company infrastructure. For example, if web or content filtering is in place, this is something usually controlled at a gateway level, not the client PC.

ISPs that implement DNS hijacking break name resolution of private addresses with a split tunnel.

Variants and related technology

Inverse split tunneling
A variant of this split tunneling is called "inverse" split tunneling. By default all datagrams enter the tunnel except those destination IPs explicitly allowed by VPN gateway. The criteria for allowing datagrams to exit the local network interface (outside the tunnel) may vary from vendor to vendor (i.e.: port, service, etc.) This keeps control of network gateways to a centralized policy device such as the VPN terminator. This can be augmented by endpoint policy enforcement technologies such as an interface firewall on the endpoint device's network interface driver, group policy object or anti-malware agent. This is related in many ways to network access control (NAC).

Dynamic split tunneling
A form of split-tunneling that derives the IP addresses to include/exclude at runtime-based on a list of hostname rules/policies. [Dynamic Split Tunneling] (DST)

IPv6 dual-stack networking
Internal IPv6 content can be hosted and presented to sites via a unique local address range at the VPN level, while external IPv4 & IPv6 content can be accessed via site routers.

References

Further reading
Juniper(r) Networks Secure Access SSL VPN Configuration Guide, By Rob Cameron, Neil R. Wyler, 2011, P. 241
Citrix Access Suite 4 Advanced Concepts: The Official Guide, 2/E, By Steve Kaplan, Andy Jones, 2006, McGraw-Hill Education
Microsoft Forefront Uag 2010 Administrator's Handbook, By Erez Ben-Ari, Ran Dolev, 2011, Packt Publishing
Cisco ASA Configuration By Richard Deal, 2009, page 413, McGraw-Hill Education

External links

Split Tunneling in Linux

Network architecture
Computer network security
Internet privacy
Virtual private networks